Commersonia hermanniifolia, commonly known as wrinkled kerrawang, is a species of flowering plant in the family Malvaceae and is endemic to New South Wales. It is a prostrate or trailing shrub with oblong to lance-shaped leaves that are paler on the lower surface, and flowers with five white sepals fading to pink and five pinkish petals.

Description
The leaves have irregular, wavy edges and are wrinkled on the upper surface, paler on the densely hairy lower surface. The stamens are dark red and there are five white staminodes surrounding the central stye.

Taxonomy
Commersonia hermanniifolia was first formally described in 1823 by Carl Sigismund Kunth in Nova Genera et Species Plantarum from an unpublished description by Jaques Étienne Gay. The specific epithet (hermanniifolia) means "Hermannia-leaved", referring to another genus in the family Malvaceae.

Distribution and habitat
Wrinkled kerrawang is a rare species mostly growing in coastal heath on sandstone cliffs or in gullies between Broken Bay and Jervis Bay and along the Shoalhaven River.

References

hermanniifolia
Flora of New South Wales
Plants described in 1823
Taxa named by Carl Sigismund Kunth